Hotel de l'Opera Hanoi is a 5 star hotel in Hanoi, Vietnam and under the MGallery Sofitel banner. Opened in 2011, the hotel was built in what was formerly the Dan Chu Hotel and Dan Chu Villa (both an early 20th Century hotel) and is state owned with management by Accor.

The 107 room hotel is housed in an unnamed French colonial era building located at 29 Trang Tien Street in Hoan Kiem District and is steps from the Hanoi Opera House and from the Hanoi's Old Quarter.

Restaurants and bars
The hotel has 2 restaurants and 1 bar
 Café Lautrec serves French cuisine
 Satine serves vietnamese cuisine
 The bar La Fée Verte

See also

 Sofitel Legend Metropole Hanoi - another Sofitel hotel in Hanoi

References

External links
 Hotel official website

Hotels in Hanoi
French colonial architecture in Vietnam
Sofitel
Hotel buildings completed in 2011
Hotels established in 2011
2011 establishments in Vietnam